Pat 'Aeroplane' O'Shea (1888–1980) was an Irish sportsperson.  He played Gaelic football with his local club Castlegregory and was a member of the Kerry senior inter-county team between 1910 until 1914.
An interesting interview was done with Pat O'Shea on Raidió na Gaeltachta in 1980 - it was aired again today 8 July 2021.

References

1888 births
1980 deaths
Castlegregory Gaelic footballers
Kerry inter-county Gaelic footballers